Radburn may refer to:

Places
Radburn, New Jersey, an American suburb and the basis for later housing planning designs known as 'Radburn estates'
Radburn (NJT station), railway station

People
Jade Radburn, English football defender 
Will Radburn,  English rugby union footballer

Other
Radburn design housing, a housing estate planning design